Haji Aliyev  (born 21 April 1991, in Nakhchivan, Azerbaijan SSR) is an Azerbaijani freestyle wrestler. He competed at the 61 kg division in the 2014 European Wrestling Championships and won the gold medal after beating Bekkhan Goygereyev of Russia.

Aliyev won his first world championship gold medal in the freestyle 61 kg class in the 2014 World Wrestling Championships in Tashkent.

Moreover, Aliyev got his second and third gold medals in Las Vegas 2015 and Paris 2017.

In June 2015, he competed in the inaugural European Games, for the host country Azerbaijan in wrestling, more specifically, Men's freestyle in the 61 kilogram range. He earned a bronze medal.

He competed in the 57 kg division at the 2016 Summer Olympics and won the bronze medal after beating Vladimir Dubov of Bulgaria. He was the flag bearer for Azerbaijan during the closing ceremonies.
His personal coach is Elman Azimzadeh.

After this success, Haji Aliyev won the European Championship among juniors held in Dawgwils, Latvia. 17-year-old Haji Aliyev, who competed in 54 kg, confidently defeated all his rivals at the finals and defeated Georgian Vladimir Khincheashvili at the decisive game and was awarded the silver medal of the European Championship. On July 25, President of the Azerbaijan Wrestling Federation Fazil Mammadov received the wrestlers who won the European Championship among juniors, including Haji Aliyev. Haci Aliyev participated in his last race in Istanbul, Turkey in 2008. Haci Aliyev, who competed in the "Presidential Tournament", was not in the list of medalists.

In 2009, Haji Aliyev won the first place in the Azerbaijani Youth Championship in February. Haci Aliyev, who tried hard in 60 kilograms, defeated Aghahuseyn Muradov in the finals and won the silver medal of the race. In March, Haji Aliyev joined the international tournament in Riga, Latvia and finished in the 5th place.

Haji Aliyev has made his next achievements in 2009 in domestic competitions. He won the tournament in October among young people dedicated to the memory of the Azerbaijani National Hero Aliyar Aliyev and became the champion of the race. In December, Haji Aliyev has won the first place among adults. He defeated all his opponents in the Cup of Azerbaijan and became the winner of the tournament.

In 2020, he won one of the bronze medals in the men's 65 kg event at the 2020 Individual Wrestling World Cup held in Belgrade, Serbia.

In August 2021 in 2020 Summer Olympics , he defeated Daulet Niyazbekov to enter Semi Finals round.

He lost his bronze medal match in the 65kg event at the 2022 World Wrestling Championships held in Belgrade, Serbia.

References

External links
 
 
 

1991 births
People from Nakhchivan
Living people
Wrestlers at the 2015 European Games
European Games medalists in wrestling
European Games bronze medalists for Azerbaijan
Azerbaijani male sport wrestlers
Olympic wrestlers of Azerbaijan
Wrestlers at the 2016 Summer Olympics
Olympic medalists in wrestling
Medalists at the 2016 Summer Olympics
Olympic bronze medalists for Azerbaijan
World Wrestling Champions
Universiade medalists in wrestling
Universiade bronze medalists for Azerbaijan
Wrestlers at the 2019 European Games
European Games gold medalists for Azerbaijan
European Wrestling Champions
Medalists at the 2013 Summer Universiade
Islamic Solidarity Games medalists in wrestling
Islamic Solidarity Games competitors for Azerbaijan
Wrestlers at the 2020 Summer Olympics
Medalists at the 2020 Summer Olympics